= Yellowstone River oil spill =

Yellowstone River oil spill may refer to:

- 2011 Yellowstone River oil spill
- 2015 Yellowstone River oil spill
